General Sir Nevil Charles Dowell Brownjohn,  (25 July 1897 – 21 April 1973) was a senior British Army officer who served as Quartermaster-General to the Forces from 1956 until his retirement in 1958.

Military career
Brownjohn was commissioned into the Royal Engineers in 1915. He served in the First World War, where he was awarded the Military Cross. In 1927 he was sent, as a captain, to China to protect the international settlement in Shanghai; he used his skills as a Russian speaker to raise a company of White Russians.

Attending the Staff College, Camberley from 1931 to 1932, he also served in the Second World War, rising to be major general in charge of supplies to General Dwight D. Eisenhower, Supreme Allied Commander, in 1943. He then became Deputy Chief of Staff at General Eisenhower's Headquarters in 1944 before being appointed Deputy Quartermaster-General in the Middle East later that year.

After the war he took charge of Administration for the British Army of the Rhine and then joined the Control Commission (British Sector) for Germany in 1947. He became Vice Quartermaster General at the War Office in 1949 and Vice Chief of Imperial General Staff in 1950. He was Chief Staff Officer at the Ministry of Defence from 1952 to 1955 when he became Quartermaster-General to the Forces; he retired in 1958.

References

Bibliography

External links
British Army Officers 1939−1945
Generals of World War II

|-
 

1897 births
1973 deaths
British Army generals
British Army generals of World War II
British Army personnel of World War I
Companions of the Order of St Michael and St George
Graduates of the Royal Military Academy, Woolwich
Graduates of the Staff College, Camberley
Knights Commander of the Order of the Bath
Knights Grand Cross of the Order of the British Empire
People educated at Malvern College
Recipients of the Military Cross
Royal Engineers officers
War Office personnel in World War II